David Ouellet may refer to:

David George Ouellet (1944–1967), American naval seaman
David Ouellet (politician) (1908–1972), Canadian Member of Parliament
David Ouellet (architect) (1844–1915), Canadian architect and wood carver